Microrape jasminatus is a moth of the Megalopygidae family. It was described by Paul Dognin in 1893. It is found in Brazil, Bolivia and Ecuador.

References

Moths described in 1893
Megalopygidae